The Trinity College Clock is an historic clock in Trinity College, Cambridge.

History and description

King Edward's Gate, in Trinity Great Court, otherwise known simply as the clock-tower, is one of the oldest buildings in the college. The first clock appears to have been installed in 1610 by Thomas Tennant, of London. The bell has survived to this day and bears the inscription:  ("Trinity resounds in unity, 1610. Richard Holdfield made me.")

Between 1726 and 1727, the clock mechanism was given to the village of Orwell, Cambridgeshire when the master, Richard Bentley, provided a new clock and dial plate and three bells. It is noted for striking the hour twice, first on a low note (the "Trinity" chime) and then a higher one (the "St John's" chime).

In 1910, this eighteenth-century clock was replaced with a mechanism by Smith of Derby to a design by Lord Grimthorpe.

The clock is governed by a temperature-compensated pendulum 2 metres in length driven by a three-legged gravity escapement. It is capable of keeping time to better than one second in a month without any intervention, except for winding up its weights at least once a week.

Monitoring project

The clock is the subject of a current project coordinated by Dr Hugh Hunt, Fellow of Trinity College Cambridge, calibrating it against the National Physical Laboratory time signal and other variables, including the amplitude of the pendulum, humidity, air temperature, air pressure, and air density.

References

External links
 The Trinity Clock website

Tourist attractions in Cambridge
Individual clocks in England
Clock